James Joseph Flood (1895-1953) was an American film director. 

Born in New York City, Flood became an assistant director with Biograph in 1912 and was active through 1952.

Career

When working on The Swellhead, Flood decided he wanted to change a scene. He told his plan to actor James Gleason who was also an accomplished playwright and he re-wrote the scene. Actress Marion Shilling then had to quickly learn and execute the new dialogue. "I was a fast study, memorized the scene in a few minutes and we did the scene in one take. Mr. Flood put his arms around me and said, 'You g.d. little trouper.'"

Personal life
Fellow director William Beaudine was his longtime friend and brother-in-law; actor and producer Bobby Anderson was his nephew (Bobby's mother was James's wife's sister).

Death
Flood died of complications after surgery in Hollywood on February 4, 1953. He was 57 years old.

Selected filmography
 Times Have Changed (1923)
 The Woman Hater (1925)
 The Man Without a Conscience (1925)
 The Wife Who Wasn't Wanted (1925)
  Satan in Sables (1925)
 Why Girls Go Back Home (1926)
 The Lady in Ermine (1927)
 Three Hours (1927)
 The Count of Ten (1928)
 Domestic Meddlers (1928)
 Marriage by Contract (1928)
Mister Antonio (1929)
 Whispering Winds (1929)
 Midstream (1929)
 The Swellhead (1930)
 The She-Wolf (1931)
 Under Cover Man (1932)
 The Mouthpiece (1932) co-directed with Elliott Nugent
 Life Begins (1932) co-directed with Elliott Nugent
 All of Me (1934)
 Such Women Are Dangerous (1934)
 Wings in the Dark (1935)
 Shanghai (1935)
 Lonely Road (1936), aka Scotland Yard Commands
 The Big Fix (1947)
 Stepchild (1947)

References

External links 
 

1895 births
1953 deaths
Film directors from New York City